Mun Tung Estate is a public housing estate in Tung Chung, Lantau Island, New Territories, Hong Kong near Yat Tung Estate, Hong Chi Shiu Pong Morninghope School, YMCA of Hong Kong Christian College, Caritas Charles Vath College and Tung Chung River. It consists of four residential buildings completed in 2018.

Houses

Politics
Mun Tung Estate is located in Mun Yat constituency of the Islands District Council. It is currently represented by Eric Kwok Ping, who was elected in the 2019 elections.

COVID-19 pandemic
Mun Wo House of the estate was in lockdown for mandatory test between 16-18 February 2022.

See also

Public housing estates on Lantau Island

References

Public housing estates in Hong Kong
Tung Chung